Skylab B was a proposed second US space station similar to Skylab that was planned to be launched by NASA for different purposes, mostly involving the Apollo–Soyuz Test Project, but was canceled due to lack of funding. Two Skylab modules were built in 1970 by McDonnell Douglas for the Skylab program, originally the Apollo Applications Program. The first was launched in 1973 and the other put in storage, while NASA considered how to use the remaining assets from Apollo.

One considered option was to use Saturn V SA-515 to launch the backup Skylab station into orbit sometime between January 1975 and April 1976. That way, it could expand the Apollo–Soyuz mission by 56–90 days.

Further proposals were made for an International Skylab, launched using Saturn V SA-514. This station would have been serviced by Apollo, Soyuz and later by the Space Shuttle. The vision of a international space station would not be realized until two decades later.

Potential uses 

Some uses considered for the second Skylab module included putting it into a rotation mode where it could generate artificial gravity and a plan to celebrate the 1976 United States Bicentennial with the launch of two Soviet Soyuz missions to the back-up Skylab.

In preparation for the Apollo–Soyuz Test Project, McDonnell Douglas proposed a massive station by combining a Salyut station with Skylab B.
This would be achieved by launching an Apollo with a multiple docking adapter with 4 docking ports to be able to dock both stations and servicing vehicles (Soyuz and Apollo). The joint US-USSR mission would have possibly been called International Skylab. Modifications would have had to have been made to the Skylab B to support a mixed oxygen-nitrogen atmosphere to match the Salyut's atmosphere, or an airlock would have been needed to be installed to allow passage between the mixed atmosphere of the Soviet segment to the pure oxygen environment of the American segment.

For future missions, the station, which would have then been called the Advanced Skylab, could have been expanded by the Space Shuttle, which was due to enter service in 1979. At the time (1973) the idea was discussed, NASA still had two Saturn V launchers (SA-514 and SA-515), three Saturn IB boosters (SA-209, SA-210, SA-211), the back-up Skylab space station (Skylab B), three Apollo CSMs (CSM-117, CSM-118 and CSM-119) and two Lunar Modules in storage (LM-13, LM-14).

However, after the first Skylab was launched in May 1973, the plan for the Skylab B was canceled and the Apollo/Soyuz spacecraft had to use the Docking Module launched on the Apollo-Saturn IB for performing experiments in space. After Project Apollo ended and as NASA was moving to developing the Space Shuttle, the remaining Apollo hardware was donated to museums in 1976.

Possible crew
It was expected at the time by those involved that the initial crew would be the crew which served as backup for Skylab 3 and Skylab 4, and was kept in reserve for the Skylab Rescue mission (minus the science pilot):

Existing hardware

Apollo CSM
The Apollo Command Module CSM-119 was originally used for Skylab Rescue.

Saturn IB
Saturn IB SA-209 was originally used for Skylab Rescue.
Saturn IB SA-211 was unused.

Saturn V 
The Saturn V SA-514 was originally designated for canceled Apollo 19. It was proposed for launching an International Skylab. This station would have been serviced by Apollo, Soyuz and later by the Space Shuttle.
 First stage (S-IC-14) on display at Johnson Space Center, second and third stages (S-II-14, S-IVB-514) on display at Kennedy Space Center.
 The S-II interstage is located at Parque de las Ciencias in Bayamón, Puerto Rico.

Saturn V SA-515 was originally designated for Apollo 20, and later to launch the backup Skylab station into orbit sometime between January 1975 and April 1976. That way, it could expand the Apollo–Soyuz mission by 56–90 days.
The first stage (S-IC-15) was on display at Michoud Assembly Facility through June 2016. This was then moved to the Infinity Sciene Center in Pearlington MS.
The second stage (S-II-15) is on display at Johnson Space Center.
The third stage (S-IVB-515) is the Skylab B Orbital Workshop on display at the National Air and Space Museum. On display in the Museum's Space Hall since 1976, the orbital workshop has been slightly modified to permit viewers to walk through the living quarters.

Airlock Module
An Airlock Module is on display at the Evergreen Aviation & Space Museum.

Training mockups
A full-size mockup once used for astronaut training is located at the Lyndon B. Johnson Space Center visitor's center in Houston, Texas.

Another full-size training mockup is at the U.S. Space & Rocket Center in Huntsville, Alabama.  Originally displayed indoors, it was subsequently stored outdoors for several years to make room for other exhibits.  To mark the 40th anniversary of the Skylab program, the Orbital Workshop portion of the trainer was restored and moved into the Davidson Center in 2013.

Multiple Docking Adapter
Multiple Docking Adapter is on display at the Kennedy Space Center Visitor Complex.

References 

 Frieling, Thomas J, Quest, "Skylab B: Unflown Missions, Lost Opportunities", 1996, Volume 5, Issue 4, page 12.

External links

Skylab B (Astronautix)
Skylab B experiment program rationale (1970)

Cancelled space stations
Cancelled American spacecraft
Skylab program
Individual spacecraft in the collection of the Smithsonian Institution